Carlos Lopez-Cantera (born December 29, 1973) is an American politician who served as the 19th lieutenant governor of Florida from 2014 to 2019.

A member of the Republican Party, Lopez-Cantera represented the 113th district in the Florida House of Representatives from 2004 to 2012; he served as Majority Leader during the final two years of his term. Lopez-Cantera was elected property appraiser of Miami-Dade County on August 14, 2012. On January 14, 2014, Gov. Rick Scott appointed Lopez-Cantera to the post of Lieutenant Governor of Florida. He served out the remainder of the unexpired term of Jennifer Carroll and was elected to a full term in November 2014.

Early life and education
Lopez-Cantera was born in Madrid, Spain, the son of Cuban Carlos Lopez-Cantera and Esther "Shelly" Smith Fano. His father is Catholic and his mother is Jewish. He was born two months prematurely and returned with his parents to reside in Miami, Florida, once he was healthy enough to travel. He earned an Associate of Arts degree from Miami-Dade Community College in 1994 and a Bachelor of Business Administration with a minor in political science from the University of Miami in 1996.

Political career

In 1997, Lopez-Cantera was a facilitator for the Florida Senate's criminal justice committee. In 2002, he made an unsuccessful bid for a seat in the Florida House of Representatives. Two years later, Lopez-Cantera won his first election to the Florida House of Representatives to the 113th District in November 2004, and was successively reelected in 2006, 2008 and in 2010 when he defeated US Navy veteran and rising democratic party star Alex Cruzet. He was House majority whip from 2008 to 2010 and the House Majority Leader from 2010 to 2012.

Lopez-Cantera was twice elected by his colleagues from Miami-Dade County to be the chairman of the Miami-Dade Legislative Delegation from 2011-2012. On August 14, 2012, he became the second property appraiser to be elected by the citizens of Miami-Dade, a county with a population of  more than 2.5 million people and almost 1,000,000 properties.

Governor Rick Scott announced Lopez-Cantera's appointment as Lieutenant Governor of Florida on January 14, 2014. Lopez-Cantera was appointed to serve the remainder of the unexpired term of Lieutenant Gov. Jennifer Carroll, who had resigned the post on March 12, 2013. In November 2014, as Scott's running mate, Lopez-Cantera was elected to a full term as lieutenant governor. He served in that role until 2019.

On July 15, 2015, Lopez-Cantera announced his 2016 candidacy for United States Senate to replace retiring Senator Marco Rubio, who was running for president of the United States. However, Lopez-Cantera withdrew from the race following Rubio's June 22, 2016 announcement that he would seek reelection to the Senate.

Personal life
Lopez-Cantara's mother is Jewish while his father is Catholic. Lopez-Cantara — whose wife (since 2005), Renee, is also Jewish, as are his two daughters — celebrated his bar mitzvah in 2016 at the Western Wall.

Electoral history

See also 
 List of minority governors and lieutenant governors in the United States

References

External links
 U.S. Senate campaign website
Florida House of Representatives Profile
Profile at Project Vote Smart

|-

|-

1973 births
21st-century American politicians
American people of Spanish descent
American politicians of Cuban descent
Hispanic and Latino American state legislators in Florida
Jewish American state legislators in Florida
American people of Spanish-Jewish descent
Lieutenant Governors of Florida
Living people
Republican Party members of the Florida House of Representatives
Miami Dade College alumni
People from Madrid
Spanish emigrants to the United States
Spanish Jews
University of Miami Business School alumni
21st-century American Jews
Latino conservatism in the United States